Norway participated in the Eurovision Song Contest 2017. The Norwegian broadcaster NRK organised the national final Melodi Grand Prix 2017 in order to select the Norwegian entry for the 2017 contest in Kyiv, Ukraine.

Background

Norway had won the contest on three occasions: in 1985 with the song "La det swinge" performed by Bobbysocks!, in 1995 with the song "Nocturne" performed by Secret Garden, and in 2009 with the song "Fairytale" performed by Alexander Rybak. Norway also had the two dubious distinctions of having finished last in the Eurovision final more than any other country and for having the most "nul points" (zero points) in the contest, the latter being a record the nation shared together with Austria. The country had finished last eleven times and had failed to score a point during four contests.

The Norwegian national broadcaster, Norsk rikskringkasting (NRK), broadcasts the event within Norway and organises the selection process for the nation's entry. The broadcaster has traditionally organised the national final Melodi Grand Prix, which has selected the Norwegian entry for the Eurovision Song Contest in all but one of their participation. On 9 June 2016, NRK revealed details regarding their selection procedure and announced the organization of Melodi Grand Prix 2017 in order to select the 2017 Norwegian entry.

Before Eurovision

Melodi Grand Prix 2017
Melodi Grand Prix 2017 was the 55th edition of the Norwegian national final Melodi Grand Prix and selected Norway's entry for the Eurovision Song Contest 2017. The show took place on 11 March 2017 at the Oslo Spektrum in Oslo, hosted by Kåre Magnus Bergh and Line Elvsåshagen. The show was televised on NRK1, NRK TV, broadcast via radio with commentary by Ole Christian Øen on NRK P1 as well as streamed online at NRK's official website nrk.no. The national final was watched by 1.155 million viewers in Norway, roughly 158,000 less than the viewing figures for 2016 but with a market share of 73%, making it the most watched Melodi Grand Prix final since 2010.

Competing entries
A submission period was opened by NRK between 9 June 2016 and 11 September 2016. Songwriters of any nationality were allowed to submit entries, while performers of the selected songs would be chosen by NRK in consultation with the songwriters. In addition to the public call for submissions, NRK reserved the right to directly invite certain artists and composers to compete. At the close of the deadline, a record-breaking 1,035 submissions were received. Ten songs were selected for the competition by a jury panel in late 2016 and early 2017. The competing acts and songs were revealed on 7 February 2017 during a press conference at NRK studios, presented by Kåre Magnus Bergh, Line Elvsåshagen and Jan Fredrik Karlsen and broadcast via NRK1 and online at mgp.no. 15-second clips of the competing entries were released during the press conference, while the songs in their entirety were premiered on 15 February.

Final
Ten songs competed during the final on 11 March 2017. The winner was selected over two rounds of voting. In the first round, the top four entries were selected by a 50/50 combination of public televoting and ten international juries to proceed to the second round, the Gold Final. The viewers and the juries each had a total of 580 points to award. Each jury group distributed their points as follows: 1–8, 10 and 12 points. The public vote was based on the percentage of votes each song achieved. For example, if a song gained 10% of the viewer vote, then that entry would be awarded 10% of 580 points rounded to the nearest integer: 58 points. In the Gold Final, the winner was selected solely by the public televote and led to the victory of "Grab the Moment" performed by Jowst with 46,064 votes.

At Eurovision

The Eurovision Song Contest 2017 took place at the International Exhibition Centre in Kyiv, Ukraine and consisted of two semi-finals on 9 and 11 May and the final on 13 May 2017. According to Eurovision rules, all nations with the exceptions of the host country and the "Big Five" (France, Germany, Italy, Spain and the United Kingdom) were required to qualify from one of two semi-finals in order to compete for the final; the top ten countries from each semi-final progressed to the final. Norway was required to be ranked among the top ten entries from their respective semi final in order to compete in the final. The European Broadcasting Union (EBU) split up the competing countries into six different pots based on voting patterns from previous contests, with countries with favourable voting histories put into the same pot. On 31 January 2017, a special allocation draw was held which placed each country into one of the two semi-finals, as well as which half of the show they would perform in. Norway was placed into the second semi-final, which was held on 11 May 2017, and was scheduled to perform in the second half of the show.

Once all the competing songs for the 2017 contest had been released, the running order for the semi-finals was decided by the shows' producers rather than through another draw, so that similar songs were not placed next to each other. Originally, Norway was set to perform in position 13, following the entry from Croatia and before the entry from Switzerland. However, following Russia's withdrawal from the contest on 13 April and subsequent removal from the running order of the second semi-final, Norway's performing position shifted to 12.

Voting

Points awarded to Norway

Points awarded by Norway

Detailed voting results
The following members comprised the Norwegian jury:
 Erland Bakke (jury chairperson)artist manager and CEO
 Karsten Marcussen (Big Daddy Karsten)rapper
 Dean Andersen (DivaDean)drag artist, member of the Great Garlic Girls
 Janne Tveiteditor
 Anne-Karine Strømsinger, represented Norway in the 1973 contest as member of the Bendik Singers and in the 1974 and 1976 contests as a solo artist

Former Head of Delegation Per Sundnes was initially announced as a member of the Norwegian jury, but he was removed after making disparaging comments about the Irish entry, which violates the EBU's rule that no jurors can disclose their opinion on the competing entries prior to the contest.

Notes and references

Notes

References

External links
Official NRK Eurovision site
Full national final on nrk.no

2017
Countries in the Eurovision Song Contest 2017
2017
Eurovision
Eurovision